Reynold Henry Hinsdale (July 15, 1879 – November 6, 1934) was an American architect.

Biography
Hinsdale was born and educated in Utica, New York and received his architectural training at the New York School of Art. He was associated with the firm of Clinton & Russell in New York City before coming to Cleveland about 1904. He is believed to have worked with J. Milton Dyer and established his own office in Cleveland in the Erie Building. He was a member of the American Institute of Architects.

Hinsdale lived at 2924 Corydon Road in Cleveland Heights.  He died in Lakeside Hospital and is buried in Knollwood Cemetery.

Projects
Series of homes on the 9200 Kempton block (1912) in Cleveland, Ohio
Gebauer Chemical Company (1918) in Cleveland, Ohio
Residence (1922) 2950 Attleboro Road Shaker Heights, Ohio
Ardleigh Drive home Euclid Golf Allotment
Park Lane Villa (1922–1923) 10518 Park Lane in Cleveland, Ohio
Apartment building 8024 Detroit Avenue (1925) for Joseph Baskin in Cleveland
Grace Evangelical Lutheran Church 146 High Street Wadsworth, Ohio
Feinway Apartments in Cleveland

References

Further reading
Withey biographical dictionary of Architects page 289

1878 births
1934 deaths
19th-century American architects
Burials at Knollwood Cemetery
20th-century American architects